North Park is a hamlet in southwestern Whalsay in the parish of Nesting in the Shetland Islands of Scotland. It lies to the north of Saltness and Symbister, just to the northwest of Hamister.

References

External links

BBC - Domesday Reloaded - Houses at N. Park and Symbister

Villages in Whalsay